Port Hedland is one of the largest iron ore loading ports in the world and the largest in Australia. In 2011 it had the largest bulk cargo throughput in Australia. With the neighboring ports of Port Walcott and Dampier, Port Hedland is one of three major iron ore exporting ports in the Pilbara region of Western Australia,

History 
Named after Captain Hedland, the Master of a ship that anchored there in 1863, Port Hedland was first developed in order to service the needs of the local pastoral industry in East Pilbara. The first jetty was built in 1896, this was extended in 1908 after the discovery of gold in the Marble Bar area.

   
Until the 1930s the port was predominantly used to import goods and stores for the local industries and to export pearl, shell, wool, livestock, gold, tin and copper. 
With the end of WW2 the port began exporting significant amounts of manganese.

The 1960s saw the development of the port by the iron ore and salt industries. Mount Goldsworthy Mining Associates, a company later absorbed by BHP Billiton, dredged an approach channel and turning basin for 65,000 DWT ships. Meanwhile, the Leslie Salt Company, from August 2001 Dampier Salt Limited (part of the Rio Tinto Group), built a land backed wharf and facilities to aid salt exports and fuel imports.

Further dredging was performed after the Mount Newman Mining Company, a subsidiary of BHP Billiton, chose Port Hedland as its export port. The new works allowed for ships up to 120,000 DWT.

Between the 1960s and today and extensive dredging and building has taken Port Hedland from a convenient anchorage to 15 berths capable of loading various ores and goods onto ships ranging from 25,000 DWT to 320,000 DWT.

In 2005/06 Port Hedland became the first Australian port to export in excess of 100 million tonnes per year. In 2010/11 the port exported a record 199 million tonnes, making it the largest port by cargo tonnage in Australia.

Port authority
Port Hedland's harbour is managed by the Pilbara Port Authority, a state government instrumentality.  The Port Authority's headquarters, control tower and heliport are at Mangrove Point, just to the west of The Esplanade at the western end of Port Hedland.

The tugboat pen, customs office and public jetty are at nearby Laurentius Point.  The harbour's wharves are located on both sides of the harbour – Finucane Island to the west and Port Hedland to the east.

Geography
The points are key references to the port and its composition.  Mangrove and Laurentius points are already mentioned, Utah Point, and Anderson Point are located in the inner part of the harbour and exist within the complex of current berths.

Berths 
Allocation of berths includes a commercial-in-confidence agreement between the PPA and BHP known as the Harriet Point agreement

Finucane Island berths - BHP berths FIA, FIB, FIC & FID, PPA Wharf 4  
Anderson Point berths - Fortescue Metals AP berths 1,2,3 and 4,5 (in South West Creek)
South West Creek - Roy Hill Stanley Point SP 1 & SP 2
Inner Harbour berths - PPA Wharves 1,2 & 3 and BHP berths Nelson Point NPA, NPB, NPC, NPD

Gallery
Access by oceangoing vessels into and out of the harbour is via a narrow curved channel.  The following series of images depicts a 225 m (246.1 yd) long bulk carrier, Darya Shanthi, using the channel to enter the harbour.  Visible in the foreground of each image is part of the harbour's system of mangroves.

Port Statistics

See also 

 Cape Lambert
 Dampier, Western Australia
 Pilbara historical timeline
 Port Hedland International Airport

References

Further reading

External links 
 Port Hedland Port Authority – About the Port
 Port Hedland Port Authority – Port Profile and Handbook

Port Hedland, Western Australia
Ports and harbours of Western Australia
Statutory agencies of Western Australia